DB Group, formerly Dongbu Group, is a conglomerate based in Seoul, South Korea. DB is engaged in insurance, financial services, and manufacturing businesses. It was established in January 1969 as Miryung Construction Company, Ltd. by Kim Jun-ki.

Subsidiaries
DB Insurance
DB Hitek

See also
Wonju DB Promy

References

External links
 

 
Chaebol
Conglomerate companies of South Korea
Conglomerate companies established in 1969
Financial services companies established in 1969
South Korean companies established in 1969